Georgios Klontzas (1535-1608) also known as George Klontzas and Zorzi Cloza dito Cristianopullo. He was a scholar, painter, and manuscript illuminator. He is one of the most influential artists of the post-Byzantine period.  He defined the Cretan Renaissance.  He worked for both Catholic and Orthodox patrons.  His artistic output included: icons, miniatures, triptychs, and illuminated manuscripts.  He is known for occupying his icons with countless figures.  The technique is extremely complex and unique to Klontzas. Andreas Pavias attempted this technique in the Crucifixion of Jesus.  Klontzas's painting All Creation rejoices in thee is his most popular work.  Klontzas influenced Theodore Poulakis he created an extremely similar painting called In Thee Rejoiceth.  Klontzas's work is strongly influenced by the Venetian school.  His triptychs strongly resemble the works of Gentile da Fabriano, namely the Intercession Altarpiece.  Klontzas's Last Judgement resembles Michelangelo's  Last Judgement in the Sistine Chapel.  There are very close similarities. There is no indication that Klontzas saw the work but it is a possibility. According to the Institute of Neohellenic Research fifty-four items of his art exist today.

History

Klontzas was born in Heraklion.  He was the son of Andreas Klontzas. His father was associated with the cultured circles of Cretan society.  His parents were wealthy, he inherited several houses.  He was also given the Greek Orthodox church of St Mark in the city of Candia (Herakleion).  In 1566, he married Ergina Pantaleos.  She was the daughter of a priest named Emmanuel Pantaleos.  Ergina and Georgios had three sons.  Loukas, Maneas, and Nicolaus.  They were all painters.  He later remarried. His second wife was Lia Vitzimanopoula.  With her, he had a fourth son.

By 1564, Klontzas was a freelance painter working all over Candia.  Two years later, he was hired to assess an icon by Domenikos Theotokopoulos.  Records indicated two paintings (now destroyed) were commissioned in 1586.  One depicted the healing of the paralyzed individual.  The other painting was for the Catholic church of the welfare institution of St Anthony in Candia.  By 1587, the painter was commissioned by the Bishop of Karpathos.  His name was Ioasaph Avouris.  Around that time he purchased his workshop.  It was located at the square of Saint Mark in the center of Candia.  Klontzas became very popular his patrons included Orthodox and Catholic institutions, Greek bourgeois, and Venetian noblemen. 

A Venetian nobleman Francesco Barozzi born in Herakleion commissioned Klontzas to create two illuminated manuscripts for Giacomo Foscarini.  Foscarini was the administrator and Tax collector of Crete.  The manuscripts contained prophecies of the Byzantine emperor Leo VI the Wise.  A third, more complex manuscript was completed during the 1590s.  It is also referred to as a leather-bound Codex.  The volume contained 217 paper folios.  There are over 400 miniature drawings.  Klontzas signature is at the end of the book.  The textual frame is proved by the seventh-century Apocalypse of Pseudo-Methodius.  It starts with the Expulsion from the Garden and ends with the Last Judgment.  The Codex features Biblical and prophetic texts ensconced with Byzantine and Ottoman history. The pictures stylistically resemble Venetian and Flemish icon paintings.  Another lesser-known artist from Crete was Markos Bathas.  He also completed a manuscript in a similar style.

The painter was probably associated with the poet Antonios Achelis.  He was the author of the Siege of Malta (1570).  Klontzas's visual motifs and Achelis's writings share a connection.
Klontzas created a book of prophecies which he gave to his son Loukas in 1597.  Klontzes died in 1608.

All Creation Rejoices In Thee

Klontzas icon hymn All Creation rejoices in Thee was inspired by a hymn that was composed by the Syrian monk John of Damascus.  It was used in the Divine Liturgy of Saint Basil the Great during the Liturgy of the Faithful.  The Hyme is as follows:

All of Creation rejoices in thee, O full of grace
the angels in heaven and the race of men,
O sanctified temple and spiritual paradise,
the glory of virgins, of whom God was incarnate
and became a child, our God before the ages.
He made thy body into a throne,
and thy womb more spacious than the heavens.
All of creation rejoices in thee, O full of grace 
Glory be to thee.

The Virgin is the central figure in the icon.  She is holding Christ while sitting on a throne, she is surrounded by several Seraphim.  She is surrounded by hierarchal concentric circles.  The highest-ranking angles are closest to the Virgin.  As the circles travel further from the Virgin the Cherubs and other angles follow.  Even further from the center are new and old testament narratives.  At the bottom is a huge group of saints in Jerusalem.  The entire universe praises Mary for her role in Jesus's work.

Klontzas painting style evolved into the complex use of figures which put the artist in a league of his own.  The maniera greca was common in Crete but Klontzas's paintings become saturated with figures. He developed his own style. Andreas Pavias Crucifixion of Jesus exhibits a similar technique.  There is a huge audience at the Crucifixion which is traditionally uncommon. Theodoros Poulakis painting In Thee Rejoiceth, is so close to Klontzas's work that it can be mistaken for a Klontzas.

Klontzas's work The Last Judgement see below exhibits a huge assortment of figures. Similar to In Thee Rejoiceth. Theodoros Poulakis in his second In Thee Rejoiceth does not cluster the figures as much as Klontzas and it may have preceded the similar work.  Klontzas's demon wolf-like figures depicted in The Last Judgement inspired many of Theodoros Poulakis dark creatures.  This is illustrated in the Archangel Michael and the Death of Moses.

Legacy

It is difficult to trace his work based on specific time frames.  Several icons bear his forged signature.  Remnants of his work can be found all over the world some in the Bodleian Library, Oxford, Moscow, State Historical Museum, and Vatican Library.  His portable icons, triptychs, and illuminated manuscripts are common and popular.
His most popular works include: In Thee Rejoiceth, The Last Judgement, Seventh Ecumenical Council, Christ Enthroned and Scenes from the Dodekaorton (Twelve Great Feasts), Sermon in a Church, and Battle of Lepanto.  A detailed manuscript map of the city of Candia with his son Maneas's signature also survives.

Gallery

Triptychs

Notable Works
In Thee Rejoiceth (Klontzas)
The Last Judgment (Klontzas)
Transfiguration and Monastic Scenes (Klontzas)

See also
Greek scholars in the Renaissance
Gentile da Fabriano
Franghias Kavertzas

References

Bibliography
 

1535 births
1608 deaths
Cretan Renaissance painters
17th-century Greek people
17th-century Greek painters
People from Heraklion
16th-century Greek painters
16th-century Greek people
Greek Renaissance humanists